Two genera of cacti were once named Echinofossulocactus:

Echinofossulocactus Lawr., now included in the genus Echinocactus
Echinofossulocactus Britton & Rose, now included in the genus Stenocactus